Andrew Ellicott Kennedy Benham (April 10, 1832 – August 11, 1905) was an American admiral. In his early career, he served in China, the Pacific and Paraguay. During the American Civil War, he took part in the capture of Port Royal, South Carolina, and patrolled the Texas coast as part of the West Gulf Blockading Squadron.

Family
Born in Staten Island, New York, near New Dorp, Benham was the son of Navy Commander Timothy Green Benham (10 August 1792 – 17 June 1860) and Juliet Lockman.  He married Emma Hester Seaman (1833–1924), the daughter of Henry John Seaman (1805–1861) and Katherine Sarah (née Seaman) Seaman (1813–1896).  They had three children: a daughter who died in infancy c. 1866; Henry Kennedy Benham born in 1867 and who died of appendicitis in 1904; and Edith Wallace Benham (1874–1962), who served for 25 years as the Social Secretary for the White House under Woodrow Wilson, Franklin Delano Roosevelt, and Harry Truman and is buried in Arlington National Cemetery.

Early service with the United States Navy
Benham was appointed a midshipman on November 24, 1847, and served in the East Indies Squadron on board the sloop-of-war  in 1847 and 1848 and on board the brig  in 1849 and 1850. In the latter warship, he participated in the capture of a pirate Chinese junk near Macau, China. During this action, he received a pike wound in the thigh. After another tour of duty in Plymouth followed by one in the frigate , Benham attended the U.S. Naval Academy in 1852 and early 1853.

Paraguay expedition

On June 10, 1853, he was promoted to passed midshipman. From mid-1853 to early 1857, he served in the sloop of war  with the Pacific Squadron. On September 16, 1855, while still in St. Mary's, Benham was commissioned a lieutenant. He next served a tour of duty with the U.S. Coast Survey late in 1857 and early in 1858. Later that year, he was transferred to the steamer Western Port (renamed Wyandotte) assigned to the expedition sent to Paraguay to extract an apology for shooting at the gunboat . In 1860, he moved to the steamer  in the Home Squadron.

American Civil War
After the Civil War broke out, Lt. Benham served on board the steamer  in the South Atlantic Blockading Squadron and, in her, took part in the capture of Port Royal, South Carolina, on November 7, 1861. On the date that rank was established, July 16, 1862, Benham was promoted to lieutenant commander. Following brief service in Sacramento, California, in 1863, he assumed command of the gunboat Penobscot and served in her through the end of the Civil War, patrolling the Texas coast as part of the West Gulf Blockading Squadron.

Post-Civil War
Following duty as a lighthouse inspector in 1870 and 1871, Benham commanded first Canonicus and then , both on the North Atlantic Station and returned to lighthouse inspecting in 1874. After commanding  on the Asiatic Station between 1878 and 1881, he went to the Portsmouth Navy Yard. The years 1885 and 1886 brought him his third tour of duty as lighthouse inspector. Following a tour of duty at League Island, Pennsylvania, in 1888, he became commandant of the Mare Island Navy Yard in 1889.

Namesakes
Three U.S. Navy ships have subsequently been named in his honor:
Benham Rise in the Philippine Sea west of Luzon was named after him.

See also

Paraguay expedition

Attribution

External links

 Admiral Benham

1832 births
1905 deaths
Union Navy officers
People from New Dorp, Staten Island
United States Navy rear admirals (upper half)
People of New York (state) in the American Civil War
United States Naval Academy alumni